Corbigny is a commune in the Nièvre department in central France.

Geography
Corbigny is located at the western end of the Morvan hills and is one of the five entry points of Parc naturel régional du Morvan. The river Anguison, a tributary of the Yonne, flows through the town. Corbigny station has rail connections to Auxerre and Laroche-Migennes.

History
The city used to be one of the first steps for pilgrims starting from Vézelay on the road to Santiago de Compostela.

On 15 January 1934, a Dewoitine tri-motor commercial airliner, the 'Emeraude' (Emerald), returning from Indochina, crashed into a hillside near Corbigny, killing all ten people aboard, including the director of Air France, Maurice Noguès, and the governor-general of the colony of French Indochina, Pierre Pasquier.

Monuments
The Saint Léonard Abbaye which was built in the 18th century is one of the city's most famous attractions. A festival of classical music takes place in this Abbaye every summer.

Demographics
On 1 January 2019, the estimated population was 1,440. The residents of Corbigny are known as Corbigeois in French.

See also
Communes of the Nièvre department

References

Communes of Nièvre
Nivernais